The 2016 BRD Năstase Țiriac Trophy was a tennis tournament played on outdoor clay courts and held at Arenele BNR in Bucharest, Romania, from 18 to 25 April 2016. It was the 24th edition and last edition of the BRD Năstase Țiriac Trophy tournament, and part of the ATP World Tour 250 series of the 2016 ATP World Tour.

Singles main draw entrants

Seeds 

 1 Rankings are as of April 11, 2016.

Other entrants  
The following players received wildcards into the singles main draw:
  Marius Copil
  Bernard Tomic
  Adrian Ungur

The following players received entry from the qualifying draw:
  Radu Albot
  Andrea Arnaboldi
  Michael Linzer
  Aldin Šetkić

Withdrawals 
Before the tournament
  Nicolas Mahut →replaced by  Marco Cecchinato

Doubles main draw entrants

Seeds 

 Rankings are as of April 11, 2016.

Other entrants 
The following pairs received wildcards into the doubles main draw:
  Marius Copil /  Adrian Ungur
  Victor Vlad Cornea /  Victor Hănescu

Withdrawals
During the tournament
  Federico Delbonis (lower back injury)

Finals

Singles 

  Fernando Verdasco defeated  Lucas Pouille, 6–3, 6–2

Doubles 

  Florin Mergea /  Horia Tecău defeated  Chris Guccione /  André Sá, 7–5, 6–4

References

External links
Official website

 

BRD Nastase Tiriac Trophy
Romanian Open
BRD Nastase Tiriac Trophy
April 2016 sports events in Europe